Paddy O'Carroll is a former competition swimmer from New Zealand.

At the 1966 British Empire and Commonwealth Games he won the bronze medal in the men's 440 yards medley relay. He also competed individually in the men's 100 and 220 yards backstroke, finishing 4th and 6th in each final respectively. Additionally O'Carroll swam in the 110 yards freestyle event.

See also
 List of Commonwealth Games medallists in swimming (men)

References

Commonwealth Games bronze medallists for New Zealand
New Zealand male medley swimmers
Swimmers at the 1966 British Empire and Commonwealth Games
Living people
Commonwealth Games medallists in swimming
Year of birth missing (living people)
Medallists at the 1966 British Empire and Commonwealth Games